Jérémy Beccu (born 22 September 1990) is a French professional boxer. As an amateur he represented France at the 2012 Olympics, reaching the first round of the light-flyweight bracket, where lost to Birzhan Zhakypov.

Amateur career
Beccu won the French championship in his weight class in 2009, 2010 and 2011. He also won gold medals at the 2009 Mediterranean Games and the 2009 Jeux de la Francophonie as well as a bronze medal at the 2008 Youth World Amateur Boxing Championships.

Professional boxing record

References

External links 

1990 births
Living people
People from Auchel
Light-flyweight boxers
Boxers at the 2012 Summer Olympics
Olympic boxers of France
French male boxers
Sportspeople from Pas-de-Calais
Mediterranean Games gold medalists for France
Mediterranean Games medalists in boxing
Competitors at the 2009 Mediterranean Games